Friedrich (Fritz) Bronsart von Schellendorf (born 1864 in Berlin – died 1950 in Kühlungsborn) was a German officer and politician. He was the chief of Staff of the Ottoman Army and was one of the many German military advisors assigned to the Ottoman Empire. He replaced Otto Liman von Sanders who was assigned to the Aegean region following disagreements with Enver Pasha. He was instrumental drafting initial war plans for the Ottoman Army. Some historians consider Bronsart von Schellendorf to have been complicit in the Armenian genocide. He was an ardent supporter of Hitler during 1930s also.

Schellendorf's comments in 1919:

Notes 

German Army generals of World War I
Ottoman military personnel of World War I
1864 births
1950 deaths
Imperial German collusion with war crimes by the Ottoman Empire
Lieutenant generals of Prussia
Military personnel from Berlin
People from the Province of Brandenburg
People of the Armenian genocide